The Flag of County Durham is the flag of the historic county of Durham. It was registered with the Flag Institute as the flag of the county in 2013, after winning an online competition to decide a flag for the county.

2013 flag 
A competition to design a new flag for County Durham was launched in July 2013 on the blog of Andy Strangeway, who had already established flags for the Ridings of Yorkshire. The competition noted that County Durham was the only traditional county in the North of England without a flag, after the adoption of the flags of Cumberland and Westmorland in 2011 and 2012.

The winning flag was chosen from six finalists, and was designed by twins Katie and Holly Moffatt alongside James Moffat from Chilton, County Durham. The flag features the Cross of St Cuthbert, counterchanged on the county colours of blue and gold.

The flag of the Scottish county of Kirkcudbrightshire, adopted in 2016, also prominently includes the Cross of St Cuthbert.

Council banner 

County Durham had long used the banner of Durham County Council as an unofficial flag of the county. This flag is the banner of arms of the County Council, the council's arms itself based on the arms of the See of Durham (Azure a Cross Or between four Lions rampant Argent). In 1961 the council adopted a coat of arms based on those of the See, with the lions holding swords and wearing crowns and the addition of five black lozenges to represent the county's coal mining industries. After the Local Government Act 1972 came into effect the council lost territory in the north to Tyne and Wear and in the south to Cleveland, whilst gaining the Startforth Rural District from the North Riding of Yorkshire council. The arms of the County Council were altered to their present form by replacing the central lozenge with a White Rose of York to represent the area of Yorkshire it governs.

References

External links
 County Durham Flag on Andy Strangeway's blog
[ Flag Institute – County Durham]

Durham
County Durham
Durham
Durham
Durham